Reza Shahroudi (born February 21, 1972) is a retired Iranian football player.

He played mostly for Persepolis. Shahroudi made 40 appearances for the Iran national football team and participated at 1998 FIFA World Cup.

He was also the coach of Damash Tehran who were set up in July 2006 by a private investor and played in Iran Football's 2nd Division at that time.

Career statistics

Club career statistics

International goals

References
Navad Newspaper

1972 births
Living people
Iranian footballers
Iran international footballers
Iranian expatriate footballers
Association football midfielders
Persepolis F.C. players
Paykan F.C. players
Altay S.K. footballers
Dalian Shide F.C. players
1998 FIFA World Cup players
Iranian football managers
People from Tehran
Iranian expatriate sportspeople in Turkey
Expatriate footballers in Turkey
Expatriate footballers in China
Keshavarz players
Süper Lig players
Iranian expatriate sportspeople in China
Footballers at the 1994 Asian Games
Asian Games competitors for Iran
Gahar Zagros F.C. managers